The 20th Century's Greatest Hits: 100 English-Language Books of Fiction is a list of the 100 best English-language books of the 20th century compiled by American literary critic Larry McCaffery. The list was created largely in response to the Modern Library 100 Best Novels list (1999), which McCaffery considered out of touch with 20th-century fiction.  McCaffery wrote that he saw his list "as a means of sharing with readers my own views about what books are going to be read 100 or 1000 years from now". 

The list includes many books not included in the Modern Library list, including five of the top ten: Thomas Pynchon's Gravity's Rainbow, Robert Coover's The Public Burning, Samuel Beckett's Trilogy (Molloy, Malone Dies and The Unnamable), Gertrude Stein's The Making of Americans, and William S. Burrough's The Nova Trilogy. Topping the list is Vladimir Nabokov's 1962 novel Pale Fire, which McCaffery called the "most audaciously conceived novel of the century."

List
{| class="sortable wikitable" style="text-align:center
|-
! width="5%" | Rank
! width="10%" | Year
! width="55%" | Title
! width="30%" | Author
|-
| align="center" | 1 || 1962 || Pale Fire || Vladimir Nabokov
|-
| align="center" | 2 || 1922 || Ulysses || James Joyce
|-
| align="center" | 3 || 1973 || Gravity's Rainbow || Thomas Pynchon
|-
| align="center" | 4 || 1977 || The Public Burning || Robert Coover
|-
| align="center" | 5 || 1929 || The Sound and the Fury || William Faulkner
|-
| align="center" | 6 || 1955, 1956, 1958 || The Trilogy (Molloy, Malone Dies, The Unnamable) || Samuel Beckett
|-
| align="center" | 7 || 1925 || The Making of Americans || Gertrude Stein
|-
| align="center" | 8 || 1961, 1962, 1964 || The Nova Trilogy (The Soft Machine, The Ticket That Exploded, Nova Express) || William S. Burroughs
|-
| align="center" | 9 || 1955 || Lolita || Vladimir Nabokov
|-
| align="center" | 10 || 1939 || Finnegans Wake || James Joyce
|-
| align="center" | 11 || 1976 || Take It or Leave It || Raymond Federman
|-
| align="center" | 12 || 1987 || Beloved || Toni Morrison
|-
| align="center" | 13 || 1994 || Going Native || Stephen Wright
|-
| align="center" | 14 || 1947 || Under the Volcano || Malcolm Lowry
|-
| align="center" | 15 || 1927 || To the Lighthouse || Virginia Woolf
|-
| align="center" | 16 || 1968 || In the Heart of the Heart of the Country || William H. Gass
|-
| align="center" | 17 || 1975 || J R || William Gaddis
|-
| align="center" | 18 || 1952 || Invisible Man || Ralph Ellison
|-
| align="center" | 19 || 1997 || Underworld || Don DeLillo
|-
| align="center" | 20 || 1926 || The Sun Also Rises || Ernest Hemingway
|-
| align="center" | 21 || 1916 || A Portrait of the Artist as a Young Man || James Joyce
|-
| align="center" | 22 || 1925 || The Great Gatsby || F. Scott Fitzgerald
|-
| align="center" | 23 || 1903 || The Ambassadors || Henry James
|-
| align="center" | 24 || 1920 || Women in Love || D. H. Lawrence
|-
| align="center" | 25 || 1981 || Sixty Stories || Donald Barthelme
|-
| align="center" | 26 || 1994 || The Rifles || William T. Vollmann
|-
| align="center" | 27 || 1955 || The Recognitions || William Gaddis
|-
| align="center" | 28 || 1902 || Heart of Darkness || Joseph Conrad
|-
| align="center" | 29 || 1961 || Catch-22 || Joseph Heller
|-
| align="center" | 30 || 1949 || Nineteen Eighty-Four || George Orwell
|-
| align="center" | 31 || 1937 || Their Eyes Were Watching God || Zora Neale Hurston
|-
| align="center" | 32 || 1936 || Absalom, Absalom! || William Faulkner
|-
| align="center" | 33 || 1975 || Dhalgren || Samuel R. Delany
|-
| align="center" | 34 || 1939 || The Grapes of Wrath || John Steinbeck
|-
| align="center" | 35 || 1984, 1986, 1992, 1993 || The Four Elements Tetralogy (The Stain, Entering Fire, The Fountains of Neptune, The Jade Cabinet) || Rikki Ducornet
|-
| align="center" | 36 || 1984, 1986, 1988 || Cyberspace Trilogy (Neuromancer, Count Zero, Mona Lisa Overdrive) || William Gibson
|-
| align="center" | 37 || 1934 || Tropic of Cancer || Henry Miller
|-
| align="center" | 38 || 1957 || On the Road || Jack Kerouac
|-
| align="center" | 39 || 1974 || Lookout Cartridge || Joseph McElroy
|-
| align="center" | 40 || 1973 || Crash || J. G. Ballard
|-
| align="center" | 41 || 1981 || Midnight's Children || Salman Rushdie
|-
| align="center" | 42 || 1960 || The Sot-Weed Factor || John Barth
|-
| align="center" | 43 || 1965 || Genoa || Paul Metcalf
|-
| align="center" | 44 || 1932 || Brave New World || Aldous Huxley
|-
| align="center" | 45 || 1924 || A Passage to India || E. M. Forster
|-
| align="center" | 46 || 1972 || Double or Nothing || Raymond Federman
|-
| align="center" | 47 || 1951 || At Swim-Two-Birds || Flann O'Brien
|-
| align="center" | 48 || 1985 || Blood Meridian || Cormac McCarthy
|-
| align="center" | 49 || 1949 || The Cannibal || John Hawkes
|-
| align="center" | 50 || 1940 || Native Son || Richard Wright
|-
| align="center" | 51 || 1939 || The Day of the Locust || Nathaniel West
|-
| align="center" | 52 || 1936 || Nightwood || Djuna Barnes
|-
| align="center" | 53 || 1980 || Housekeeping || Marilynne Robinson
|-
| align="center" | 54 || 1969 || Slaughterhouse-Five || Kurt Vonnegut
|-
| align="center" | 55 || 1988 || Libra || Don DeLillo
|-
| align="center" | 56 || 1952 || Wise Blood || Flannery O'Connor
|-
| align="center" | 57 || 1985 || Always Coming Home || Ursula K. Le Guin
|-
| align="center" | 58 || 1930, 1932, 1936 || U.S.A. Trilogy (The 42nd Parallel, 1919, The Big Money) || John Dos Passos
|-
| align="center" | 59 || 1962 || The Golden Notebook || Doris Lessing
|-
| align="center" | 60 || 1951 || The Catcher in the Rye || J. D. Salinger
|-
| align="center" | 61 || 1929 || Red Harvest || Dashiell Hammett
|-
| align="center" | 62 || 1981 || What We Talk About When We Talk About Love || Raymond Carver
|-
| align="center" | 63 || 1914 || Dubliners || James Joyce
|-
| align="center" | 64 || 1923 || Cane || Jean Toomer
|-
| align="center" | 65 || 1905 || The House of Mirth || Edith Wharton
|-
| align="center" | 66 || 1980 || Riddley Walker || Russell Hoban
|-
| align="center" | 67 || 1956, 1958, 1963 || The Checkerboard Trilogy (Go in Beauty, The Bronc People, Portrait of the Artist with 26 Horses) || William Eastlake
|-
| align="center" | 68 || 1976 || The Franchiser || Stanley Elkin
|-
| align="center" | 69 || 1985, 1986, 1986 || The New York Trilogy (City of Glass, Ghosts, The Locked Room) || Paul Auster
|-
| align="center" | 70 || 1990 || Skinny Legs and All || Tom Robbins
|-
| align="center" | 71 || 1996 || Infinite Jest || David Foster Wallace
|-
| align="center" | 72 || 1995 || The Age of Wire and String || Ben Marcus
|-
| align="center" | 73 || 1966 || Tlooth || Harry Mathews
|-
| align="center" | 74 || 1969 || Pricksongs and Descants || Robert Coover
|-
| align="center" | 75 || 1962 || The Man in the High Castle || Philip K. Dick
|-
| align="center" | 76 || 1991 || American Psycho || Brett Easton Ellis
|-
| align="center" | 77 || 1969 || The French Lieutenant's Woman || John Fowles
|-
| align="center" | 78 || 1980, 1981, 1982, 1983 || The Book of the New Sun Tetralogy (The Shadow of the Torturer, The Claw of the Conciliator, The Sword of the Lictor, The Citadel of the Autarch) || Gene Wolfe
|-
| align="center" | 79 || 1962 || A Clockwork Orange || Anthony Burgess
|-
| align="center" | 80 || 1975, 1978, 1983 || Albany Cycle (Legs, Billy Phelan's Greatest Game, Ironweed) || William Kennedy
|-
| align="center" | 81 || 1995 || The Tunnel || William H. Gass
|-
| align="center" | 82 || 1966 || Omensetter's Luck || William H. Gass
|-
| align="center" | 83 || 1949 || The Sheltering Sky || Paul Bowles
|-
| align="center" | 84 || 1981 || Darconville's Cat || Alexander Theroux
|-
| align="center" | 85 || 1968 || Up || Ronald Sukenick
|-
| align="center" | 86 || 1969 || Yellow Back Radio Broke-Down || Ishmael Reed
|-
| align="center" | 87 || 1919 || Winesburg, Ohio || Sherwood Anderson
|-
| align="center" | 88 || 1987 || You Bright and Risen Angels || William T. Vollmann
|-
| align="center" | 89 || 1948 || The Naked and the Dead || Norman Mailer
|-
| align="center" | 90 || 1968 || The Universal Baseball Association, Inc., J. Henry Waugh, Prop. || Robert Coover
|-
| align="center" | 91 || 1970 || Creamy and Delicious || Steve Katz
|-
| align="center" | 92 || 1980 || Waiting for the Barbarians || J. M. Coetzee
|-
| align="center" | 93 || 1953 || More Than Human || Theodore Sturgeon
|-
| align="center" | 94 || 1979 || Mulligan Stew || Gilbert Sorrentino
|-
| align="center" | 95 || 1929 || Look Homeward, Angel || Thomas Wolfe
|-
| align="center" | 96 || 1925 || An American Tragedy || Theodore Dreiser
|-
| align="center" | 97 || 1981 || Easy Travel to Other Planets || Ted Mooney
|-
| align="center" | 98 || 1989 || Tours of the Black Clock || Steve Erickson
|-
| align="center" | 99 || 1990 || In Memoriam to Identity || Kathy Acker
|-
| align="center" | 100 || 1995 || Hogg || Samuel R. Delany

Statistics
Not counting the tetralogies of Rikki Ducornet (#35) and Gene Wolfe (#78), the most cited author is James Joyce, who has written four works on the list: Ulysses (#2), Finnegans Wake (#10), A Portrait of the Artist as a Young Man (#21), and Dubliners (#63).  Robert Coover and William H. Gass each have three works on the list, while Samuel Delany, Don DeLillo, William Faulkner, Raymond Federman, William Gaddis, Vladimir Nabokov, and William Vollmann have two apiece.

Titles in common with Modern Library 100 Best Novels
Altogether, there are 34 titles in common between the Modern Library list and the Greatest Hits list:

 The Ambassadors
An American Tragedy
Brave New World
Catch-22
The Catcher in the Rye
A Clockwork Orange
The Day of the Locust
Finnegans Wake
The Grapes of Wrath
The Great Gatsby
Heart of Darkness
The House of Mirth
Invisible Man
Ironweed
Lolita
Midnight's Children
The Naked and the Dead
Native Son
Nineteen Eighty-Four
On the Road
Pale Fire
A Passage to India
A Portrait of the Artist as a Young Man
The Sheltering Sky
Slaughterhouse-Five
The Sound and the Fury
The Sun Also Rises
To the Lighthouse
Tropic of Cancer
Ulysses
Under the Volcano
The USA Trilogy
Winesburg, Ohio
Women in Love

See also
Modern Library 100 Best Novels
Marcel Reich-Ranicki's anthology of exemplary German literature Der Kanon

References

External links 
 List published in American Book Review (Volume 20, Issue 6) 
 List featured on Spineless Books website 
 List on librarything.com with images of contemporary covers 

20th-century novels
Lists of novels
Top book lists